The Women's League (WL) is a Myanmar professional league for women's football clubs. At the top of the Myanmar football league system, it is the country's primary football competition. Contested by 8 teams. The Myanmar League is a corporation in which the 8 member teams. Since 2016 it has been sponsored by Kanbawza Bank, a Banking company based in Yangon, and are thus billed as KBZ Bank Women's League.

History
Myanmar Women's League was founded with seven women's team in 2016. The Women's League was sponsored by Kanbawza Bank. Myawady Women team won first time ever Myanmar Women League Champion.

Records

All-time top scorers 

 

Figures for active players (in bold).

Champions

Award

Top scorer

See also
 Myanmar Football Federation
 Myanmar National League
 MNL-2

References

External links
 Official website
 Official FB site

Women
Myanmar
2016 establishments in Myanmar
Sports leagues established in 2016
Women's football leagues in Myanmar